Azeniina is a subtribe of owlet moths in the family Noctuidae. There are at least 10 described species in Azeniina.

Genera
 Aleptinoides Barnes & McDunnough, 1912
 Azenia Grote, 1882
 Narthecophora Smith, 1900
 Tristyla Smith, 1893

References

 Lafontaine, J. Donald & Schmidt, B. Christian (2010). "Annotated check list of the Noctuoidea (Insecta, Lepidoptera) of North America north of Mexico". ZooKeys, vol. 40, 1-239.

Further reading

External links

 Butterflies and Moths of North America

Amphipyrinae